Herman van den Belt (born 1 January 1970) is a Dutch professional basketball coach, most known for his 25 years coaching Landstede Hammers of the Dutch Basketball League (DBL).

Starting from 1996, van den Belt has been the head coach of Landstede Hammers. The only exception was the 2009–10 season, in which he was an assistant-coach of West-Brabant Giants. In 2019, he won his first DBL championship with Zwolle.

During the 2022–23 season, on 7 March 2023, Hammers and Van den Belt parted ways after 25 years with the club.

Honours
Landstede 
Dutch Basketball League: 2018–19
Dutch Supercup: 2017
DBL Coach of the Year (3): 2001–02, 2004–05, 2015–16

References

Living people
Dutch basketball coaches
Dutch Basketball League coaches
People from Rijssen
Landstede Hammers coaches
1970 births
Sportspeople from Overijssel